Artedius fenestralis, the padded sculpin, is a species of marine ray-finned fish belonging to the family Cottidae, the typical sculpins.  The species is native to the eastern Pacific, with a range extending from the Alaska Peninsula to Southern California.  It grows to a maximum length of 14 centimeters and subsists on a diet of shrimp and small fishes.

References

External links
 Padded Sculpin (Artedius fenestralis) at the Encyclopedia of Life

fenestralis
Fish described in 1883
Fish of the Pacific Ocean
Fish of the Western United States
Taxa named by David Starr Jordan
Taxa named by Charles Henry Gilbert